Wucui District is one of four districts of the prefecture-level city of Yichun, Heilongjiang, China. It was established by merging the former Cuiluan District and parts of Wumahe District approved by Chinese State Council in 2019. Its administrative centre is at Shuguang Subdistrict.

Administrative divisions 
Wucui District is divided into 4 subdistricts. 
4 subdistricts
 Umahe, Jinshan, Shuguang, Xiangyang

References

Yichun